Vlijmen is a town in the Dutch province of North Brabant. It is located in the municipality of Heusden, about 6 km west of 's-Hertogenbosch.

Vlijmen was a separate municipality between 1821 and 1997. It was created from part of the former municipality Vlijmen en Engelen. After Haarsteeg and Nieuwkuijk were added to it in 1935, Vlijmen as municipality ceased to exist when it became part of Heusden in 1997.

Notable people
 Michael van Gerwen, professional darts player
 Lars Boom, professional cyclist

Gallery

References

Municipalities of the Netherlands disestablished in 1997
Populated places in North Brabant
Former municipalities of North Brabant
Heusden